Walton Grange No. 1454 is a historic Grange building located at 137 Stockton Avenue in Walton in Delaware County, New York, United States. Designed by architects Randall and Gilbert of Walton and built in 1886, it consists of a two-story administration building with an attached gable roofed drill shed. It was occupied from 1886-1896 by the 33rd Separate Company then vacated in 1896 and converted for use as a school and a Grange hall. It was listed on the National Register of Historic Places in 1998 as Walton Grange #1454-Former Armory.

The Stockton Avenue Armory, a National Guard armory built in 1896, is located next to the Grange building. It was designed by Isaac Perry. It was occupied from 1896 to 1965 and converted to White Castle Department Store in 1966. It is now known as the Castle on the Delaware and is being restored to host events. It is also home to a cafe. In 2016 it was separately listed on the National Register as the Second Walton Armory (33rd Separate Company).

The South Street Armory, located at 55 South Street, was constructed in 1965.

See also
National Register of Historic Places listings in Delaware County, New York

References

Armories on the National Register of Historic Places in New York (state)
Grange organizations and buildings in New York (state)
National Register of Historic Places in Delaware County, New York
Government buildings completed in 1886
Buildings and structures in Delaware County, New York
Grange buildings on the National Register of Historic Places